The 1991 UK Athletics Championships was the national championship in outdoor track and field for the United Kingdom held at Cardiff Athletics Stadium, Cardiff. It was the second time that the event was held in the Welsh capital, following on from the 1990 championships there. Strong winds affected several of the jumps on the programme. A women's hammer throw was added to the schedule for the first time, though it was not classified as a UK championship event at the competition.

It was the fifteenth edition of the competition limited to British athletes only, launched as an alternative to the AAA Championships, which was open to foreign competitors. However, due to the fact that the calibre of national competition remained greater at the AAA event, the UK Championships this year were not considered the principal national championship event by some statisticians, such as the National Union of Track Statisticians (NUTS). Many of the athletes below also competed at the 1991 AAA Championships.

Three athletes won a third straight UK title, all of them throwers: Paul Head (hammer), Sharon Gibson (javelin) and Jackie McKernan (discus). Five further athletes defended their 1990 titles: Linford Christie (100 m), David Sharpe (800 m), Paul Edwards (shot put), Andy Ashurst (pole vault) and Alison Wyeth (1500 m). Judy Oakes returned to the top of the women's shot put podium to take a record-breaking ninth UK title. No athlete won multiple UK titles, though Michael Rosswess managed runner-up in both short sprints.

The main international track and field competition for the United Kingdom that year was the 1991 World Championships in Athletics. Liz McColgan added the world 10,000 metres title to her UK 3000 m title. Though neither Roger Black nor Kriss Akabusi topped the UK podium, they won medals at the world level that year.

Medal summary

Men

Women

References

UK Athletics Championships
UK Outdoor Championships
Athletics Outdoor
Sports competitions in Cardiff
Athletics competitions in Wales